Jaganlu (also Romanized as Jaganlū; also known as Chaganī, Chakānlū, Jaganhi, and Jakanlū) is a village in Mehraban-e Sofla Rural District, Gol Tappeh District, Kabudarahang County, Hamadan Province, Iran. At the 2006 census, its population was 167, in 35 families.

References 

Populated places in Kabudarahang County